Apetina, also known as Pïlëuwimë or Puleowime, is a village in the South Eastern jungle area of Suriname within the Tapanahony resort in the Sipaliwini District. The majority of Apetina's population is the Wayana people. These Indians mostly originate from Brazil and once have fled because of tribal warfare. 
There also is primary school and an airstrip located near the Indian village of Apetina.

Geography 

The Apetina Airstrip lies in between the villages of Apetina and Akani Pata.

Notes

References 

Indigenous villages in Suriname
Populated places in Sipaliwini District